Jam Up Hollow is a valley in Shannon County in the U.S. state of Missouri. The intermittent stream of the valley is a small west flowing tributary of Pine Hollow about four miles southeast of Delaware on Mahans Creek.

Jam Up Hollow was so named on account of its uneven and narrow terrain.

References

Valleys of Shannon County, Missouri
Valleys of Missouri